Oto Seviško (1 October 1892 – 26 June 1958) was a Latvian sprinter. He competed in the men's 100 metres and the 200 metres events at the 1924 Summer Olympics.

References

External links
 

1892 births
1958 deaths
Latvian male sprinters
Athletes (track and field) at the 1924 Summer Olympics
Olympic athletes of Latvia
Athletes from Riga